Mauclair is a surname of French origin. Notable people with the surname include:

Camille Mauclair (1872-1945), French poet, novelist, biographer, travel writer, and art critic
Jacques Mauclair (1919-2001), French film actor
Joseph Mauclair (1906-1990), French professional road bicycle racer